Wesley Moodie and Todd Perry won the title, defeating Novak Djokovic and Radek Štěpánek 6–4, 3–6, [15–13] in the final.

Seeds

Draw

Draw

External links
 Draw

Doubles